Charles d'Angennes de Rambouillet (1530–1587) was a French Roman 
Catholic bishop and cardinal.

Biography

Charles d'Angennes de Rambouillet was born in the Château de Rambouillet on 30 October 1530, the son of Jean d'Angennes, seigneur of Rambouillet, governor of Dauphiné.

As a young man, he spent a long period of time at the court of the King of France, and was sent abroad on several embassies.  A cleric of Le Mans, he became a counselor of the French king.

On 27 July 1556 he was elected Bishop of Le Mans; he was subsequently consecrated as a bishop.  He did not take possession of his diocese until 1560.  During his time as Bishop of Le Mans, his diocese was invaded by Calvinists who attacked Le Mans Cathedral.

Charles IX of France named him ambassador to Pope Pius V.  He participated in the Council of Trent from 13 November 1562 until its closing.  From 1568 on, he was the French ambassador to the Holy See.

Pope Pius V made him a cardinal priest in the consistory of 17 May 1570.  He received the red hat and the titular church of San Simeone Profeta on 9 June 1570.  On 20 November 1570 he opted for the titular church of Sant'Euphemia.

He participated in the papal conclave of 1572 that elected Pope Gregory XIII.  The new pope named him papal legate to Umbria in 1578.  He later participated in the papal conclave of 1585 that elected Pope Sixtus V.  He became governor of Corneto in 1587.

He died in Corneto on 23 March 1587 and was buried in Corneto in the Church of San Francesco of the Friars Minor of the Observants.

References 

1530 births
1587 deaths
People from Rambouillet
16th-century French cardinals
Cardinals created by Pope Pius V
Ambassadors of France to the Holy See